The Motor City Reapers were to have been a professional indoor football team based in Fraser, Michigan. The team was slated to join the Great Lakes Indoor Football League as an expansion team in 2007. The Reapers were to have been the third indoor football team to be based in the Detroit metro area. The first was the Detroit Drive, an early member of in the Arena Football League, considered to have been the sport's first dynasty, and the second was the AFL's Detroit Fury. The owner of the Reapers was to have been Mike Zak, Sr. The Reapers were scheduled to play their home games at the Great Lakes Sports City Superior Arena in Fraser, Michigan.

Franchise history
In June 2006, The Reapers were announced to be joining the Great Lakes Indoor Football League as an expansion team for the 2007 season. Team owner Mike Zak, Sr. believed that his team would have the fortitude to stay in the area whereas the previous teams did not. However,t he team never took the field, with Zak citing "personal reasons" for not playing in 2007. There was word that the team would play in 2008, but they never played a game.

References

External links
 Official Website of the Motor City Reapers 

American football teams in Detroit
Former Continental Indoor Football League teams
American football teams established in 2006
American football teams disestablished in 2006